Amadou Ly is a Senegalese-American actor, writer, producer known for his role in The Twilight Saga: Breaking Dawn – Part 2, and The Tested. In 2006, Amadou's life story made front page of The New York Times and received other national attention.

Early life 
Amadou Ly was born in the country of Senegal. On 10 September 2001, at the age of 13, Amadou and his mother arrived in America to live in Harlem. In 2002 his mother moved back to Senegal, leaving him at the age of 14. He shuttled between New York City and a family friend in Indiana.

Friends in his after-school technology club became his family, and he excelled in robotics. In 2006, during his senior year of high school, his East Harlem team won a regional robot-building competition. Ly, who had no government-issued identification, was unable to fly with his teammates to the national finals in Atlanta, Georgia. More importantly, he faced a bigger problem that the publicity forced him to reveal: he had no legal status to remain in the United States. The staff supervising the technology club rallied to send him by train, and contacted the media for help on his immigration status. Public officials and others called on the Department of Homeland Security to allow him to stay in the country. A long immigration battle ensued, and he was ultimately granted permanent residency  to live in the United States, which enabled him to go on to college.

Career 
Amadou took an acting class to improve his public speaking skills, and ended up finding a new talent. He started his training in New York with William Esper, and on graduation moved to Hollywood. He took to the stage at the Actors Playpen Theatre in Sex, Relationships and Sometimes Love, and it didn't take long for an agent to see his potential. Amadou played the role of Henri in Twilight Breaking Dawn Part 2. .

Personal life 
On 27 August 2014, Amadou became a U.S. citizen, reciting the Oath of Allegiance at a judicial naturalization ceremony in Los Angeles. Residing in Los Angeles, he is still acting.

Filmography 
 The Twilight Saga: Breaking Dawn – Part 2 ....Henri (2012)
 The Tested ....James Luke (2010)
 L'embrasement .... (2007)

References

External links 
 

Senegalese male film actors
Living people
Year of birth missing (living people)
Senegalese emigrants to the United States
American male film actors